Aldealseñor is a municipality located in the province of Soria, Castile and León, Spain. As of 2018 it had a population of 30 people.

References

Municipalities in the Province of Soria